Titouna is a village in the Boumerdès Province in Kabylie, Algeria.

Location
The village is surrounded by Isser River and the towns of Souk El-Had, Thénia and Beni Amrane in the Khachna mountain range.

Buildings
 Ferme Gauthier

Notable people

Gallery

References

Villages in Algeria
Boumerdès Province
Kabylie